Chloe Cole (born ) is an American activist who opposes access to gender-affirming care for minors and supports bans on such care following her own detransition. She has appeared with conservative politicians, and in the media, supporting and advocating for such bans. Cole began transitioning at 12, and detransitioned at 17, after having undergone treatment which included puberty blockers, testosterone, and a double mastectomy.

Personal life 
Cole is from California's Central Valley. She reported facing mental health challenges as a minor that included being on the autism spectrum. She is a detransitioner, and describes herself as a "former trans kid". Cole says that she was diagnosed with gender dysphoria at 9 years old and was treated by Kaiser Permanente clinics in the San Francisco Bay Area between the ages of 13 and 17. Cole said she was sexually assaulted during her eighth grade year and began binding her breasts afterward. She began transitioning at 12 years old. In February 2018, she was prescribed the puberty blocker Lupron at age 13. A month later, she started testosterone injections, which she continued for two years. Cole had a double mastectomy at age 15 in June 2020. Less than a year after the surgery, she realized she may want to breastfeed someday, which she would not be able to do. At 17, she reverted to using her birth name and detransitioned. Cole has said that her doctor did not follow the standards of care from the World Professional Association for Transgender Health (WPATH) and that she didn't know detransitioners existed until she was one. When she expressed regret to her gender care specialist, they offered to recommend a surgeon for breast reconstruction, which she decided not to pursue.

She has described herself as having been a "tomboy" who didn't fit social norms and only started thinking about transitioning after creating an Instagram account and reportedly being recommended lots of LGBTQ content, particularly content containing transgender boys, telling The Daily Signal Podcast that "social media introduced this idea that I could be a boy".

Cole's parents have stayed out of the media spotlight. Cole says she does not hold them responsible for consenting to her treatment and surgery and that they "received intense social pressure and pressure from medical professionals".

Activism

Legislation 

Starting in May 2022, Cole began testifying in the United States against medical transition and appeared on Fox News to denounce gender-affirming care for minors. She has said that neither minors nor their parents should be able to consent to such care and that parents face "extreme external pressures to consent." According to the Sacramento Bee, Cole's views on gender-affirming care for minors diverge from those of major medical professionals associations, including the American Academy of Pediatrics, American Medical Association, American Psychological Association, and WPATH.

In May 2022, Cole testified in support of Ohio House Bill 454, which would ban gender-affirming care for minors. The bill failed to make it through the session but was revised and reintroduced in 2023.

In July, Cole testified in favor of an eventually passed Florida bill that denied Medicaid coverage for procedures that alter primary or secondary sexual characteristics for both adults and children. The law has established that they are not a "medical necessity" since any coverage must meet this requirement. Cole was one of eight detransitioners, who spoke in favor of a Florida Board of Medicine measure that would bar minors from "receiving puberty blockers, hormone therapy or surgeries as treatment for gender dysphoria." Cole was the only one of the eight who had received such care before the age of 18. During the public comment period, Cole asked "why is a mental health epidemic not being addressed with mental health treatment to get at the root causes for why female adolescents like me want to reject their bodies?"

In September, Cole spoke at a press conference organized by Republican Congresswoman and anti-trans activist Marjorie Taylor Greene in support of her "Protect Children's Innocence Act".
Cole said that while she didn't agree with everything any politician says, this bill which "protects children from the harm" that she endured was a cause she "could get behind". The act would make it a felony to provide any gender-affirming care to a minor, prohibit the use of federal funds for gender-affirming care or towards health insurance covering it for all ages, and prohibit colleges from offering instruction in such care.

The same month, Cole testified against a bill introduced by Senator Scott Wiener to make California a sanctuary state for children seeking gender-affirming care. The bill was passed and went into effect in January 2023.

In September 2022, Dawn Ennis, writing for the Los Angeles Blade, described Cole as "the poster child for far-right politicians and religious conservatives working to ban gender-affirming care and to prosecute the doctors and parents who support their children’s transitions for child abuse."

In January 2023, Cole testified in support of Utah House Bill 132, which would ban gender-affirming care for transgender minors. Before the hearing, a crowd of approximately 200 gathered on the steps of the Capitol to rally in support of the state's transgender youth. The protestors included LGBTQ advocates, parents of transgender kids, and transgender adults and youth themselves. Parents of transgender youth testified against the bill.

In February, Cole testified in favor of Kansas Senate Bill 233, which would ban gender-affirming puberty blockers, hormone therapy, and surgeries for minors, allow for civil suits against, and revoke the licenses of, doctors who provided such care. Cole said that those under 18 should not be allowed to make these decisions and that the surgeries do more harm than good.

In Wyoming, state senator Anthony Bouchard sponsored Senate File 144, which he dubbed "Chloe's Law" after Cole. The bill would lead to doctors' licenses being revoked if they administer gender-affirming care to minors. Bouchard said the focus on doctors reflects one of Cole's main concerns, namely that schools and doctors convince parents to allow their child to transition, and that "Chloe doesn't want to make criminals out of her parents". Bouchard also announced his intention to support Senate File 111, which would make providing such care felony child abuse. When Bouchard announced "Chloe's Law" on Twitter, Cole responded "thank you, Senator. I will support this bill in any way I can."

Cole then spoke in favor of a Tennessee bill that would ban gender-affirming healthcare for minors, defined as any healthcare that would assist in identifying with, or living as, a purported identity inconsistent with their assigned sex at birth.

In Idaho, Representative Bruce Skaug proposed a bill to ban gender-affirming care for those under 18 and make providing such care a felony. Cole accepted an invitation from the Idaho Freedom Foundation, a conservative think tank, to speak in support of the bill.

Rallies 
In October 2022, Cole was among a number of speakers at a "Rally to End Child Mutilation" hosted by right-wing commentator Matt Walsh in Nashville.

In January 2023, Cole was one of five panelists who spoke at an event titled "Stolen Innocence: A Panel on the Insidious Ideology Infecting Your Children's Education", about schools allegedly sexually grooming students by teaching them about gender identity and sexual orientation.

The same month in Murfreesboro, Tennessee, Cole was a speaker at a "Teens Against Gender Mutilation Rally", sponsored by Turning Point USA. Cole described the trans community as "a cult" and spoke against gender-affirming care for minors. Eventbrite reportedly unpublished the listing due to violating their policies on "Hateful, Dangerous, or Violent Content and Events".

In March 2023, The Independent described Cole as "a 'detransitioner' who has become a central figure in a right-wing campaign to restrict gender-affirming care, despite the vast majority of trans people maintaining their gender identity." That month, she spoke at the Conservative Political Action Conference in Washington DC, on a panel titled "A Time for Courage".

Later that month, Cole headlined a Detransition Awareness Day rally in Sacramento, CA. Roughly 40 people gathered in opposition to gender-affirming care. Nearby, counter-protesters gathered.

Platform 
In mid-July 2022 she started a GoFundMe called "Imperfectly Me", aimed at providing a platform for detransitioners.

Lawsuit 

On November 9, 2022, Cole filed a 90-day notice of intent to sue against the healthcare company Kaiser Permanente along with the individual endocrinologist, psychiatrist, and plastic surgeon involved in her treatment. Cole was represented by Harmeet Dhillon (the chief executive of the Center for American Liberty) and the law-firm LiMandri & Jonna LLP. The lawsuit,  was filed in the San Joaquin County Superior Court in Manteca on February 22, 2023.

The suit claims that Cole's care included "off label" treatment and "amounted to medical experimentation." According to the suit, Cole was not given adequate information to provide informed consent to her hormone therapy and later developed joint pain, weak bone density, and ongoing urinary tract infections. Cole claims that doctors didn't inform her or other parents of alternative, less invasive treatments like psychiatric care and that they told her that her gender dysphoria would "never resolve unless she chemically/surgically transitioned”. The case is the second known lawsuit filed in the United States on this topic; Camille Kiefel, a 32-year-old woman, filed a similar case in Multnomah County, Oregon, in 2022.

Erin Allday, writing for the San Francisco Chronicle, described Cole's case as a "political touchstone for conservative groups pushing against transgender rights and access to gender-affirming care for young people."

The Economist opined that, should detransitioning suits such as Cole's be successful, insurers could come to regard gender transition treatments as a liability, which would raise the treatment costs and make providers more careful about advertising; it added that, if the facts of the case were as claimed, it could give pro-transitioning activists cause for reflection on how care is currently provided.

See also 
 Bell v Tavistock – court case in the United Kingdom about the use of puberty blockers

References 

2003 births
American women activists
Living people
People from California
People who detransitioned